Pericallis tussilaginis is a species of flowering plant in the family Asteraceae.

References

External links
 
 

tussilaginis